Zaw Moe (born 28 June 1967) is a Burmese professional golfer. 

He turned professional in 1989 and begun to have success on the Asian circuit. In 1997 he won the SingTel Ericsson Singapore Open on the Asian Tour, and in the late 1990s he also played regularly on the Japan Golf Tour. In the mid-2000s Moe battled health problems, including a serious liver infection, but in 2011 he retained his Asian Tour card for the first time since 2007 by finishing 40th in the Order of Merit.

Professional wins (5)

Asian Tour wins (1)

Asian Tour playoff record (0–3)

Other wins (4)
1992 3 TDC Tour of Malaysia wins
1993 Singapore PGA Championship

External links

Burmese male golfers
Asian Tour golfers
Japan Golf Tour golfers
People from Singapore
1967 births
Living people